The India men's national under-21 volleyball team represents India in men's under-21 volleyball events, it is controlled and managed by the India Volleyball Association that is a member of Asian volleyball body Asian Volleyball Confederation (AVC) and the international volleyball body government the Fédération Internationale de Volleyball (FIVB).

Results

FIVB U21 World Championship

Asian Men's U20 Volleyball Championship

See also 
 India men's national volleyball team

References

External links

National men's under-21 volleyball teams